Varis is a village of the Grevena municipality. Before the 2011 local government reform it was a part of the municipality of Ventzio. The 2011 census recorded 42 residents in the village. Varis is a part of the community of Exarchos.

Notable people 
 Marius Macrionitis, Jesuit and Roman Catholic Archbishop of Athens, was born in Varis

See also
 List of settlements in the Grevena regional unit

References

Populated places in Grevena (regional unit)